Fountain Hill School District was a school district in Fountain Hill, Arkansas. It operated one school, Fountain Hill School. The mascot was the wildcat.

On July 1, 2004, it consolidated into the Hamburg School District.

References

Further reading
 2004-2005 School District Map
 Map of Arkansas School Districts pre-July 1, 2004
 (Download)

External links
 

Education in Ashley County, Arkansas
Defunct school districts in Arkansas
School districts disestablished in 2004
2004 disestablishments in Arkansas